Nuestra Belleza Baja California 2010, was held in Tijuana, Baja California on August 6, 2010. At the conclusion of the final night of competition, Nancy Galaz of Tijuana was crowned the winner. Galaz was crowned by outgoing Nuestra Belleza Baja California titleholder, Ana Sofía García. Six contestants competed for the state title.

The pageant was hosted by Cristina Covarrubias and Luis Eduardo Cantua.

Results

Placements

Special awards

Contestants

References

External links
Official Website

Nuestra Belleza México
Beauty pageants in Tijuana